Nanjing a sub-provincial city and it is divided into 11 districts. Nanjing is further divided into 100 township-level divisions.

County-level divisions

Township-level divisions

Historical divisions

ROC (1911-1949)

References

Nanjing